Marinomonas fungiae is a Gram-negative, aerobic, rod-shaped and motile bacterium from the genus of Marinomonas which has been isolated from the coral Ctenactis echinata from the Andaman Sea.

References

Oceanospirillales
Bacteria described in 2014